The 12985 / 12986 Jaipur–Delhi Sarai Rohilla AC Double Decker Express is a Superfast Express train belonging to Indian Railways – North Western Railway zone that runs between Jaipur Junction and Delhi Sarai Rohilla in India.

It operates as train number 12985 from Jaipur Junction to Delhi Sarai Rohilla and as train number 12986 in the reverse direction

Coaches

The 12985/86 Jaipur–Delhi Sarai Rohilla AC Double Decker Express presently has 1 Executive Class & 13 AC Chair Car Coaches in addition to 2 EOG coaches.

As with most train services in India, coach composition may be amended at the discretion of Indian Railways depending on demand.

Service

The 12985/86 Jaipur–Delhi Sarai Rohilla AC Double Decker Express covers the distance of 303 kilometers in 4 hours 30 mins (67.33 km/hr) in both directions.

As the average speed of the train is above 55 km/hr, as per Indian Railways rules, its fare includes a Superfast surcharge.

Routeing

Traction

A (DLS) based WAP 7 locomotive hauls the train for the entire route.

Time Table

12985 Jaipur–Delhi Sarai Rohilla AC Double Decker Express leaves Jaipur Junction on a daily basis and reaches Delhi Sarai Rohilla the same day. Leaving at 06:00 AM from Jaipur, it reaches Sarai at 10:30 AM, after journey period of four and a half hours.

12986 Delhi Sarai Rohilla–Jaipur AC Double Decker Express leaves Delhi Sarai Rohilla on a daily basis and reaches Jaipur Junction the same day. Starts at 05:35 PM from Sarai and reaches Jaipur at 10:05 PM, after journey period of four and a half hours.

The schedule of this 12985/12986 Jaipur - Delhi Sarai Rohilla AC Double Decker Express is given below:-

External links

References 

Transport in Jaipur
Transport in Delhi
Railway services introduced in 2012
Rail transport in Rajasthan
Rail transport in Haryana
Rail transport in Delhi
Double-decker trains of India